Brachystelma schinzii is a species of plant in the family Apocynaceae. It is endemic to Namibia.

References

schinzii
Endemic flora of Namibia
Least concern plants
Least concern biota of Africa
Taxonomy articles created by Polbot